Senator Keyes may refer to:

Henry W. Keyes (1863–1938), U.S. Senator from New Hampshire
Henry Keyes (1810–1870), Vermont State Senate
Perley Keyes (1774–1834), New York State Senate

See also
Senator Key (disambiguation)